The 2017–18 Oman Professional League is the 42nd edition of the top football league in Oman.

Foreign players
Restricting the number of foreign players strictly to four per team, including a slot for a player from AFC countries. A team could use four foreign players on the field during each game including at least one player from the AFC country.

League table

References

External links
Season 2017-18 at soccerway.com

Top level Omani football league seasons
2017–18 in Omani football
Oman